Franks is an Anglo-American surname, derived from the given name Frank and originally came from England and Germany. The name was in the early records, of the Virginia Colony, starting in the 1660s. The Jewish surname, Franks has also been found as early as the 17th century, in New York City. 

People with the surname include:
Abigail Franks (1696–1756), American colonist
Dick Franks (1920–2008), American civil servant
Augustus Wollaston Franks (1826–1897), English antiquarian
Bobby Franks (1909–1924), murder victim
Bubba Franks (born 1978), American footballer
Carl Franks (born 1960), American college football coach
Cecil Franks (born 1935), English politician
David Franks (loyalist) (1720–1794), English colonist
David Franks (aide-de-camp) (1740–1793), aide-de-camp of Benedict Arnold
Feleipe Franks (born 1997), American football player
Herman Franks (1914–2009), American baseball player
Hermina Franks (1914–2010), American baseball player
Jordan Franks (born 1996), American football player
Lawrence Franks Jr. (1987–2020), American rapper known professionally as Huey
Lynne Franks (born 1948), English public relations consultant
Michael Franks (musician) (born 1944), American singer-songwriter
Michael Franks (athlete) (born 1963), American sprinter
Mike Franks (tennis) (born 1936), American tennis player
Oliver Shewell Franks (1905–1992), English philosopher
Paul Franks (born 1979), English cricketer
Philip Franks (born 1956), British actor
Bob Franks (1951–2010), American politician
Stephen Franks (born 1950), New Zealand lawyer
Tanya Franks (born 1967), English actress
Tillman Franks (1920–2006), American bassist and songwriter
Tim Franks (born 1968), British journalist
Tommy Franks (born 1945), American general
Trent Franks (born 1957), American politician
Wilbur R. Franks (1901–1986), Canadian scientist
William Sadler Franks (1851–1935), British astronomer

See also
Frank (surname)
Frank (given name)
Franks (disambiguation)

References

External links
ancestry.com

English-language surnames